Aldo Osborn "Al" Richins (November 2, 1910 – April 19, 1995) was a Mexican-American American football wingback who played one season with the Detroit Lions of the National Football League. He is distinguished as being the first Mexican to play in the National Football League.

Early years
Richins attended West High School in Salt Lake City, Utah, where he received "Athlete of the Year" honors in 1929. He was later inducted into the West High School "Hall of Fame.

He played college football at University of Utah, and was a part of the 1932 and 1933 Rocky Mountain Athletic Conference champions. He received the school's most outstanding athlete of the year award in 1934.

Professional career
In 1935, he signed with the Detroit Lions of the National Football League. He played as a wingback and was released after 2 games.

In 1946 at 36 years old, he played for the Salt Lake Seagulls of the Pacific Coast Football League.

Personal life
After football, he joined the Salt Lake County Sheriff's Office, before owning a motel and a restaurant. He died on April 19, 1995.

References

External links
Just Sports Stats

1910 births
1995 deaths
Players of American football from Salt Lake City
American football running backs
Mexican players of American football
Utah Utes football players
Detroit Lions players
Sportspeople from Chihuahua (state)